Manlio Sgalambro (9 December 1924 – 6 March 2014) was an Italian philosopher and writer, born in Lentini.

Biography

Philosophical production 
Sgalambro did not have certificates or degrees as business cards: how he became a writer of philosophy – whose books are translated into French, German and Spanish – is a mystery that he was not able to explain.

Beginning In 1945 he worked jointly with the review Prisma (directed by Leonardo Grassi): the first writing is Paralipomeni all'irrazionalismo.

In 1947 he matriculated at the University of Catania:

From 1959, along with Sebastiano Addamo, he wrote for the magazine Incidenze (founded by Antonio Corsano).  His first article for the journal was Crepuscolo e notte (reprinted in 2011). Meanwhile he wrote for the journal Tempo presente (directed by Nicola Chiaromonte and Ignazio Silone).

In 1963, at the age of 39, he got married. The income from citrus orchards inherited from his father was no longer sufficient so he chose to supplement it by undertaking a thesis for a degree and teaching.

In the late 1970s Sgalambro began to organize his thoughts in systematic work.  Then at the age of 55, he sent his first book, La morte del sole, to the editor Adelphi:

In the following years, with the same editor, he published: Trattato dell'empietà, Anatol, Del pensare breve, Dialogo teologico, Dell'indifferenza in materia di società, La consolazione, Trattato dell'età, De mundo pessimo and La conoscenza del peggio e Del delitto.

In the meanwhile, in the early 1990s, with some friends he established a small editorial activity in Catania: De Martinis. On the inside, Sgalambro managed pamphlets, publishing a pair of works (Dialogo sul comunismo and Contro la musica) and printed some operas by Giulio Cesare Vanini and Julien Benda.

Collaboration with Battiato 
In 1993 he encountered Franco Battiato, accidentally, during the presentation of a common friend's poetry book. After few days, Battiato asked him to a meeting to propose to him the libretto for the opus Il cavaliere dell'intelletto about Frederik II of Hohenstaufen:

From 1994 until his death he collaborated on almost every one of Franco Battiato's projects. For him he wrote:
 the libretti of the opera Il cavaliere dell'intelletto, Socrate impazzito, Gli Schopenhauer and Campi magnetici;
 the lyrics of many pop music albums (L'ombrello e la macchina da cucire, L'imboscata, Gommalacca, Ferro battuto, Dieci stratagemmi, Il vuoto, etc.);
 the screenplays of the movies Lost Love, Musikanten (about the last years of Beethoven's life) and Niente è come sembra, of the television transmission Bitte keine réclame and of the documentary Auguri don Gesualdo (about Gesualdo Bufalino).

Starting in 1998 he penned song lyrics for Patty Pravo (Emma), Fiorella Mannoia (Il movimento del dare), Carmen Consoli (Marie ti amiamo) and Milva (Non conosco nessun Patrizio).

In 2000 he published the single La mer, containing the cover of the famous song by Charles Trenet.

In 2001 he published the album Fun club, produced by Franco Battiato and Saro Cosentino, containing evergreen songs like La vie en rose (by Édith Piaf) and Moon river (by Henry Mancini), but even the ironic Me gustas tú (by Manu Chao).

In 2007 he lent his voice to the DC-9 airliner in Pippo Pollina's opera Ultimo volo ("Last flight"), about the 1980 loss of Itavia Flight 870 in the Ustica massacre.

In 2009 he published the single La canzone della galassia, containing the cover of The galaxy song (taken from Monty Python's The meaning of life), sung with the Sardinian-English group Mab.

Bibliography 
 La morte del sole (Adelphi, 1982).
 Trattato dell'empietà (Adelphi, 1987).
 Vom Tod der Sonne (German edition of La morte del sole, Hanser, 1988).
 Del metodo ipocondriaco (Il Girasole, 1989).
 La morte del sole (second edition, Adelphi, 1996).
 Trattato dell'empietà (second edition, Adelphi, 2005).
 Anatol (Adelphi, 1990).
 Anatol (French edition of Anatol, Circé, 1991).
 Del pensare breve (Adelphi, 1991).
 Dialogo teologico (Adelphi, 1993).
 Contro la musica: sull'ethos della musica (De Martinis, 1994).
 Dell'indifferenza in materia di società (Adelphi, 1994).
 De la pensée brève (French edition of Del pensare breve, Circé, 1995).
 Dialogo sul comunismo (De Martinis, 1995).
 La consolazione (Adelphi, 1995).
 Teoria della canzone (Bompiani, 1997).
 Nietzsche: frammenti di una biografia per versi e voce (Bompiani, 1998).
 Sphère de la mémoire & Éléments de théologie: dialogues philosophiques (French edition of Dialogo teologico, Circé, 1998).
 Poesie (limited edition, La Pietra Infinita, 1999).
 Trattato dell'età: una lezione di metafisica (Adelphi, 1999).
 Traité de l'âge: une leçon de métaphysique (French edition of Trattato dell'età, Payot, 2001).
 Opus postumissimum: frammento di un poema (Giubbe Rosse, 2002).
 De mundo pessimo (Adelphi, 2004).
 Quaternario: racconto parigino (Il Girasole, 2006).
 Nietzsche: frammenti di una biografia per versi e voce (second edition, Bompiani, 2006).
 La conoscenza del peggio (Adelphi, 2007).
 Del delitto (Adelphi, 2009).
 La consolación (Spanish edition of La consolazione, Pre-Textos, 2009).
 L'impiegato di filosofia (limited edition, La Pietra Infinita, 2010).
 Crepuscolo e notte (Mesogea, 2011).
 Nell'anno della pecora di ferro (Il Girasole, 2011).
 Marcisce anche il pensiero: frammenti di un poema (Bompiani, 2011).

Discography

Album 
 Fun club (Sony music entertainment Italy, 2001 – ).

Singoli 
 La mer (Sony music entertainment Italy, 2000).
 Me gustas tú (Sony music entertainment Italy, 2001).
 La canzone della galassia (Sony music entertainment Italy, 2009).

Videography

Videoclips 
 Tre poesie (2004).
 La canzone della galassia (2009).

Collaborations

Literature 
 Arthur Schopenhauer, La filosofia delle università (Adelphi, 1992 – ).
 Giulio Cesare Vanini, Confutazione delle religioni (De Martinis, 1993).
 Julien Benda, Discorso coerente sui rapporti tra Dio e il mondo (De Martinis, 1994).
 Giuseppe Tornatore, Una pura formalità (De Martinis, 1994).
 Maurizio Cosentino, I sistemi morali (Boemi, 1998).
 Ottavio Cappellani, La morale del cavallo: trattato dei cavalieri (Nadir, 1998).
 Tommaso Ottonieri, Elegia sanremese (Bompiani, 1998).
 Domenico Trischitta, Daniela Rocca: il miraggio in celluloide (Boemi, 1999).
 Salvo Basso, Dui (Prova d'autore, 1999).
 Manlio Sgalambro & Davide Benati, Segrete (La pietra infinita, 2001).
 Mariacatena De Leo & Luigi Ingaliso, Nell'antro del filosofo: dialogo con Manlio Sgalambro (Prova d'autore, 2002 – ).
 Manlio Sgalambro, Silvia Batisti & Rossella Lisi, Opus postumissimum: frammento di un poema (Giubbe rosse, 2002).
 Manlio Sgalambro & Antonio Contiero, Dolore e poesia (La pietra infinita, 2003).
 Vincenzo Mollica, Franco Battiato: l'alba dentro l'imbrunire (Einaudi, 2004).
 Riccardo Mondo & Luigi Turinese, Caro Hillman: venticinque scambi epistolari con James Hillman (Bollati Boringhieri, 2004 – ).
 Antonio Contiero, Galleria Buenos Aires (Aliberti, 2006 – ).
 Luca Farruggio, Bugie estatiche (Il filo, 2006 – ).
 Bruno Monsaingeon, Incontro con Nadia Boulanger (Rue Ballu, 2007 – ).
 Cristina Valenti, Ustica e le sue arti: percorsi tra impegno creatività e memoria (Titivillus, 2007 – ).
 Franco Battiato, In fondo sono contento di aver fatto la mia conoscenza (Bompiani & L'ottava, 2007).
 Anna Vasta, I malnati (I quaderni del battello ebbro, 2007 – ).
 Michele Falzone, Franco Battiato: la Sicilia che profuma d'oriente (Flaccovio, 2008 – ).
 Arnold De Vos, Il giardino persiano (Samuele, 2009).
 Angelo Scandurra, Quadreria dei poeti passanti (Bompiani, 2009 – ).
 AA.VV., Catania: non vi sarà facile si può fare lo facciamo (ANCE, 2009).
 Franco Battiato, Don Gesualdo: con i contributi di Manlio Sgalambro e Antonio Di Grado (Bompiani & Kasba comunicazioni, 2010).
 Domenico Cipriano, Novembre (Transeuropa, 2010 – ).
 Carlo Guarrera, Occhi aperti spalancati (Mesogea, 2011).

Music

Album 
 Franco Battiato, L'ombrello e la macchina da cucire (EMI music Italy & L'ottava, 1995 – ).
 Franco Battiato, L'imboscata (Polygram Italy & L'ottava, 1996 – ), released even in Spain as La emboscada (Polygram Italy & L'ottava, 1997 – ).
 Franco Battiato, L'imboscata tour (Polygram Italy & L'ottava, 1997)
 Franco Battiato, Gommalacca (Polygram Italy & L'ottava, 1998 – ).
 Franco Battiato, Fleurs (Universal music Italy & L'ottava, 1999 – ).
 Franco Battiato, Campi magnetici (Sony music entertainment Italy & L'ottava, 2000 – ).
 Franco Battiato, Ferro battuto (Sony music entertainment Italy & L'ottava, 2001 – ), translated even in Spain as Hierro forjado (Sony music entertainment Italy & L'ottava, 2001 – ).
 AA.VV., Invasioni (New scientist, 2001).
 Franco Battiato, Fleurs 3 (Sony music entertainment Italy & L'ottava, 2002 – ).
 Franco Battiato, Colonna sonora di Perduto amor (Sony music entertainment Italy & L'ottava, 2003 – ).
 Alice, Viaggio in Italia (NuN entertainment, 2003 – ).
 Franco Battiato, Last summer dance (Sony music entertainment Italy & L'ottava, 2003 – ).
 Franco Battiato, Dieci stratagemmi: attraversare il mare per ingannare il cielo (Sony music entertainment Italy & L'ottava, 2004 – ).
 Franco Battiato, Un soffio al cuore di natura elettrica (Sony music entertainment Italy & L'ottava, 2005 – ).
 Franco Battiato, Il vuoto (Universal music Italy & L'ottava, 2007 – ).
 Pippo Pollina, Ultimo volo: orazione civile per Ustica (Storie di note, 2007 – ).
 Lilies on Mars, Lilies on Mars (Lilies on Mars, 2008).
 Fiorella Mannoia, Il movimento del dare (Sony music entertainment Italy, 2008 – ).
 Franco Battiato, Fleurs 2 (Universal music Italy & L'ottava, 2008 – ).
 Alice, Lungo la strada (EMI music Italy, 2009).
 Carmen Consoli, Elettra (Universal music Italy & Narciso records, 2009 – ).
 Franco Battiato, Inneres Auge: il tutto è più della somma delle sue parti (Universal music Italy & L'ottava, 2009 – ).
 Milva, Non conosco nessun Patrizio (Universal music Italy, 2010 – ).
 Carmen Consoli, Per niente stanca (Universal music Italy & Narciso records).

Singles 
 Franco Battiato, Strani giorni (Polygram Italy & L'ottava, 1996 – ).
 Franco Battiato, Shock in my town (Polygram Italy & L'ottava, 1998 – ).
 Franco Battiato, Il ballo del potere (Polygram Italy & L'ottava, 1996).
 Franco Battiato, Running against the grain (Sony music entertainment Italy & L'ottava, 2001 – ). 
 Alice, Come un sigillo (NuN entertainment, 2003).
 Franco Battiato, Il vuoto (Universal music Italy & L'ottava, 2007).
 Franco Battiato, Tutto l'universo obbedisce all'amore (Universal music Italy & L'ottava, 2008).
 Franco Battiato, Inneres Auge (Universal music Italy & L'ottava, 2009).

Songs 
 L'ombrello e la macchina da cucire (1995 – lyrics by Manlio Sgalambro; music by Franco Battiato).
 Breve invito a rinviare il suicidio (1995 – lyrics by Manlio Sgalambro; music by Franco Battiato).
 Piccolo pub (1995 – lyrics by Manlio Sgalambro; music by Franco Battiato).
 Fornicazione (1995 – lyrics by Manlio Sgalambro; music by Franco Battiato).
 Gesualdo da Venosa (1995 – lyrics by Manlio Sgalambro; music by Franco Battiato).
 Moto browniano (1995 – lyrics by Manlio Sgalambro; music by Franco Battiato).
 Tao (1995 – lyrics by Manlio Sgalambro; music by Franco Battiato).
 Un vecchio cameriere (1995 – lyrics by Manlio Sgalambro; music by Franco Battiato).
 L'esistenza di Dio (1995 – lyrics by Manlio Sgalambro; music by Franco Battiato).
 Di passaggio (1996 – lyrics by Franco Battiato and Manlio Sgalambro; music by Franco Battiato).
 Strani giorni (1996 – lyrics by Manlio Sgalambro; music by Franco Battiato).
 La cura (1996 – lyrics by Franco Battiato and Manlio Sgalambro; music by Franco Battiato).
 Ein Tag aus dem Leben des kleinen Johannes (1996 – lyrics by Manlio Sgalambro; music by Franco Battiato).
 Amata solitudine (1996 – lyrics by Manlio Sgalambro; music by Franco Battiato).
 Splendide previsioni (1996 – lyrics by Manlio Sgalambro and Fleur Jaeggy; music by Franco Battiato).
 Ecco com'è che va il mondo (1996 – lyrics by Manlio Sgalambro; music by Franco Battiato).
 Segunda-feira (1996 – lyrics by Manlio Sgalambro; music by Franco Battiato).
 Memoria di Giulia (1996 – lyrics by Manlio Sgalambro; music by Franco Battiato).
 Serial killer (1996 – lyrics by Manlio Sgalambro; music by Franco Battiato).
 Decline and fall of the Roman empire (1996 – lyrics by Manlio Sgalambro; music by Franco Battiato).
 Shock in my town (1998 – lyrics by Franco Battiato and Manlio Sgalambro; music by Franco Battiato).
 Auto da fé (1998 – lyrics by Franco Battiato and Manlio Sgalambro; music by Franco Battiato).
 Casta diva (1998 – lyrics by Franco Battiato and Manlio Sgalambro; music by Franco Battiato).
 Il ballo del potere (1998 – lyrics by Franco Battiato and Manlio Sgalambro; music by Franco Battiato).
 La preda (1998 – lyrics by Manlio Sgalambro; music by Franco Battiato).
 Il mantello e la spiga (1998 – lyrics by Manlio Sgalambro; music by Franco Battiato).
 È stato molto bello (1998 – lyrics by Manlio Sgalambro; music by Franco Battiato).
 Quello che fu (1998 – lyrics by Manlio Sgalambro; music by Franco Battiato).
 Vite parallele (1998 – lyrics by Manlio Sgalambro; music by Franco Battiato).
 E.Shackleton (1998 – lyrics by Manlio Sgalambro and Fleur Jaeggy; music by Franco Battiato).
 Stage door (1998 – lyrics by Franco Battiato and Manlio Sgalambro; music by Franco Battiato).
 Emma (1998 – lyrics by Manlio Sgalambro; music by Franco Battiato).
 L'incantesimo (1998 – lyrics by Manlio Sgalambro; music by Franco Battiato).
 Medievale (1999 – lyrics by Manlio Sgalambro; music by Franco Battiato).
 Invito al viaggio (1999 – lyrics by Manlio Sgalambro; music by Franco Battiato).
 Running against the grain (2001 – lyrics by Manlio Sgalambro and Franco Battiato; music by Franco Battiato).
 Bist du bei mir (2001 – lyrics by Manlio Sgalambro and Franco Battiato; music by Franco Battiato).
 La quiete dopo un addio (2001 – lyrics by Manlio Sgalambro and Franco Battiato; music by Franco Battiato).
 Personalità empirica (2001 – lyrics by Manlio Sgalambro and Franco Battiato; music by Franco Battiato).
 Il cammino interminabile (2001 – lyrics by Manlio Sgalambro; music by Franco Battiato).
 Lontananze d'azzurro (2001 – lyrics by Manlio Sgalambro and Franco Battiato; music by Franco Battiato).
 Sarcofagia (2001 – lyrics by Manlio Sgalambro; music by Franco Battiato).
 Scherzo in minore (2001 – lyrics by Franco Battiato and Manlio Sgalambro; music by Franco Battiato, Django Reinhardt and Stéphane Grappelli).
 Il potere del canto (2001 – lyrics by Manlio Sgalambro; music by Franco Battiato).
 Invasione di campo (2001 – lyrics by Manlio Sgalambro; music by Luca Nuzzolo).
 Come un sigillo (2002 – lyrics by Franco Battiato and Manlio Sgalambro; music by Franco Battiato).
 Tra sesso e castità (2004 – lyrics by Manlio Sgalambro and Franco Battiato; music by Franco Battiato).
 Le aquile non volano a stormi (2004 – lyrics by Manlio Sgalambro and Franco Battiato; music by Kinimori Yajima and Franco Battiato).
 Ermeneutica (2004 – lyrics by Manlio Sgalambro and Franco Battiato; music by Franco Battiato).
 Fortezza Bastiani (2004 – lyrics by Franco Battiato and Manlio Sgalambro; music by Franco Battiato).
 Odore di polvere da sparo (2004 – lyrics by Manlio Sgalambro; music by Franco Battiato and Krisma).
 Conforto alla vita (2004 – lyrics by Manlio Sgalambro; music by Franco Battiato).
 23 coppie di cromosomi (2004 – lyrics by Manlio Sgalambro; music by Franco Battiato and Krisma).
 Apparenza e realtà (2004 – lyrics by Manlio Sgalambro and Franco Battiato; music by Franco Battiato and Krisma).
 La porta dello spavento supremo (2004 – lyrics by Franco Battiato and Manlio Sgalambro; music by Franco Battiato).
 Il vuoto (2007 – lyrics by Franco Battiato and Manlio Sgalambro; music by Franco Battiato).
 I giorni della monotonia (2007 – lyrics by Franco Battiato and Manlio Sgalambro; music by Franco Battiato).
 Aspettando l'estate (2007 – lyrics by Manlio Sgalambro; music by Franco Battiato).
 Niente è come sembra (2007 – lyrics by Franco Battiato and Manlio Sgalambro; music by Franco Battiato).
 Tiepido aprile (2007 – lyrics by Franco Battiato and Manlio Sgalambro; music by Franco Battiato).
 The game is over (2007 – lyrics by Franco Battiato and Manlio Sgalambro; music by Franco Battiato).
 Io chi sono (2007 – lyrics by Franco Battiato and Manlio Sgalambro; music by Franco Battiato).
 Stati di gioia (2007 – lyrics by Franco Battiato and Manlio Sgalambro; music by Franco Battiato).
 Il movimento del dare (2008 – lyrics by Manlio Sgalambro and Franco Battiato; music by Franco Battiato).
 Tutto l'universo obbedisce all'amore (2008 – lyrics by Manlio Sgalambro; music by Franco Battiato).
 Tibet (2008 – lyrics by Manlio Sgalambro and Franco Battiato; music by Franco Battiato).
 Marie ti amiamo (2009 – lyrics by Franco Battiato, Carmen Consoli and Manlio Sgalambro; music by Franco Battiato and Carmen Consoli).
 Inneres Auge (2009 – lyrics by Franco Battiato and Manlio Sgalambro; music by Franco Battiato).
  'U cuntu (2009 – lyrics by Franco Battiato and Manlio Sgalambro; music by Franco Battiato).
 Non conosco nessun Patrizio (2010 – lyrics by Manlio Sgalambro; music by Franco Battiato and Juri Camisasca).

Cinema

Movies 
 Franco Battiato, Perduto amor (L'ottava & Sidecar, 2003 – ).
 Franco Battiato, Musikanten (L'ottava & RAI cinema, 2005 – ).
 Franco Battiato, Niente è come sembra (Bompiani & L'ottava, 2007 – ).

Documentaries 
 Daniele Consoli, La verità sul caso del signor Ciprì e Maresco (Zelig, 2004).
 Guido Cionini, Manlio Sgalambro: il consolatore (Nexmedia, 2006).
 Franco Battiato, Auguri don Gesualdo (Bompiani & Kasba comunicazioni, 2010 – ).

Videos 
 Franco Battiato, L'ombrello e la macchina da cucire (1995).
 Franco Battiato, Di passaggio (1996).
 Franco Battiato, Strani giorni (1996).
 Franco Battiato, Shock in my town (1998).
 Franco Battiato, Running against the grain (2001).
 Franco Battiato, Bist du bei mir (2001).
 Franco Battiato, Ermeneutica (2004).
 Franco Battiato, La porta dello spavento supremo (2004).
 Franco Battiato, Il vuoto (2007).
 Franco Battiato, Inneres Auge (2009).

Theater 
 Manlio Sgalambro & Franco Battiato, Il cavaliere dell'intelletto: opera in due atti per l'ottocentenario della nascita di Federico II di Svevia (1994).
 Manlio Sgalambro & Franco Battiato, Socrate impazzito (1995).
 Manlio Sgalambro & Franco Battiato, Gli Schopenhauer (1998).
 Igor Stravinsky, L'histoire du soldat (1999).
 Franco Battiato, Campi magnetici: i numeri non si possono amare (2000).
 Pippo Pollina, Ultimo volo: orazione civile per ustica (2007).
 Manlio Sgalambro, Carlo Guarrera & Rosalba Bentivoglio, Frammenti per versi e voce (2009).

Television 
 Franco Battiato, Bitte keine réclame (2004).

Curiosities

Music 
 In Di passaggio (from L'imboscata) he declaims in ancient Greek:

 In Invito al viaggio (from Fleurs) he declaims (in Italian):

 In Corpi in movimento (from Campi magnetici) he declaims (in Italian):

Since 1996 he participates in almost every Franco Battiato's tours:
 In '97 he declaims in Latin on Battiato's song Areknames (from Pollution), renamed for the occasion Canzone chimica:

 In 2002 he sings a new version – with lyrics adapted philosophically – of Accetta il consiglio (taken from The big Kahuna), published the next year in live album Last summer dance.

Cinema 
 In Perduto amor he acts Martino Alliata, philosophy teacher of the leading character (Corrado Fortuna).
 In Musikanten he acts a noble man from Siena.

Theater 
 In L'histoire du soldat and in Campi magnetici he is the narrator.

References

External links 
 Manlio Sgalambro's official web site

1924 births
2014 deaths
People from Lentini
Italian male poets
20th-century Italian philosophers
21st-century Italian philosophers
Aphorists
20th-century Italian poets
20th-century Italian male writers